NPHS is an initialism which may stand for:

 National Public Health Service, A government health organisation in Wales.

U.S. High schools
 North Port High School, a public high school in North Port, Florida
 New Paltz High School, a public high school in New Paltz, New York
 New Philadelphia High School, a public high school in New Philadelphia, Ohio
 Newbury Park High School, a public school in Newbury Park, California
 North Penn High School, a high school in Towamencin Township, Pennsylvania
 North Pole High School, a public high school in North Pole, Alaska
 New Providence High School, a public high school in New Providence, New Jersey
 North Providence High School, a public high school in North Providence, Rhode Island